Hot Limit may refer to:

Hot Limit (song), the T.M.Revolution's 1998 song covered by High and Mighty Color
Hot Limit (manga), a Japanese manga